is a public park in Itabashi Ward, Tokyo, Japan.

Facilities
Itabashi Traffic Park has a mini-cycling course and it lends out bicycles and foot-operated go-karts (free of charge) to children over 5 years old so that they can go around the course.
There is also an infant area for all children including those under 5 years old to ride bicycles and tricycles (also lent out by the park).

Attractions
There are also exhibits of a Tokyo Metropolitan Expressway bus and Tokyo Toden tram (no. 7508) that children and adults can go inside.

See also
 Parks and gardens in Tokyo
 National Parks of Japan

References

 www.city.itabashi.tokyo.jp (PDF file)
 www.city.itabashi.tokyo.jp

External links
 iko-yo.net

Parks and gardens in Tokyo